Svargarohana Parva or the Book of the Ascent to Heaven, is the last of eighteen books of the Indian epic Mahabharata. It traditionally has 6 chapters. The critical edition has 5 chapters. It is one of the shortest books in the Mahabharata.

The Svargarohana Parva describes the arrival of Yudhishthira to heaven, his visit to hell, and what he finds in both places. Yudhishthira is upset when he finds evil people in heaven and good people in hell. He demands that he be sent to hell where people who love him are present. The gods then reveal that their loved ones are indeed in heaven. The Parva ends with Yudhishthira happy.

Structure and chapters

The Svargarohana Parva (book) traditionally has 6 adhyayas (chapters) and has no secondary parvas (sub-chapters). It is the second shortest book of the epic.

After entering heaven, Yudhishthira is frustrated to find people in heaven who had sinned on earth. He then asks for a visit to hell, where he finds people whom he had thought were good and virtuous on earth. He questions whether the gods were fair at all, and whether virtue during earthly life meant anything. In a fit of anger, he demands that he be sent to hell so he may be with those people who were good, just, virtuous, whom he loved, and who loved him. The gods then caused the illusory hell they had created as a test to vanish. Yudhishthira's father, the deity Dharma appears, and congratulates Yudhishthira for standing up for dharma sending him to Vaikuntha, where he finds eternal bliss.

Yudhishthira is happy. He meets Krishna, in his form as Vishnu. He then sees Draupadi in heaven with his other brothers.

English Translations

Svargarohana Parva was composed in Sanskrit. Several translations in English are available. Two translations from 19th century, now in public domain, are those by Kisari Mohan Ganguli and Manmatha Nath Dutt. The translations vary with each translator's interpretations.

Debroy, in 2011, notes that updated critical edition of Svargarohana Parva, after removing verses generally accepted so far as spurious and inserted into the original, has 5 adhyayas (chapters) and 194 shlokas (verses).

Significance

Svargarohana Parva is significant for claiming Vyasa as the creator of a poem with 6,000,000 verses with all the eternal knowledge there is. Of these, he gave the gods 3,000,000 verses, 1,500,000 verses to Pitrs (ancestors), 400,000 verses to Yakshas (nature-spirits) and 100,000 verses as Mahabharata to human beings. It does not disclose where the unaccounted for 1,000,000 verses are. It ends with the claim that the Epic has all the shades of Truth in it.

Chapter 4 of Svargarohana Parva is also significant for claiming Krishna in the form of Brahman. In Anushasana Parva, Krishna was declared to be a form Vishnu and of Shiva. This synonymous listing of various forms of Krishna as one, in Mahabharata, has led to the theory that all gods mentioned in Vedic literature are different forms of one God.

Quotes & Teachings

Svargarohana Parva, Chapter 5:

See also
 Previous book of Mahabharata: Mahaprasthanika Parva
 Epilogue, Supplement to Mahabharata: Harivamsa

References

External links
 Svargarohana Parva, English Translation by Kisari Mohan Ganguli
 Svargarohana Parva, English Translation by Manmatha Nath Dutt
 Svargarohana Parva in Sanskrit by Vyasadeva with commentary by Nilakantha - Worldcat OCLC link
 Svargarohana Parva in Sanskrit and Hindi by Ramnarayandutt Shastri, Volume 5

Parvas in Mahabharata

ru:Сабхапарва
te:సభా పర్వము